Rhadinorhynchus is a genus of worms belonging to the family Rhadinorhynchidae.

The genus has cosmopolitan distribution.

Species:

Rhadinorhynchus africanus 
Rhadinorhynchus atheri 
Rhadinorhynchus bicircumspinus 
Rhadinorhynchus biformis 
Rhadinorhynchus cadenati 
Rhadinorhynchus camerounensis 
Rhadinorhynchus capensis 
Rhadinorhynchus carangis 
Rhadinorhynchus chongmingensis 
Rhadinorhynchus chongmingnensis 
Rhadinorhynchus circumspinus 
Rhadinorhynchus cololabis 
Rhadinorhynchus decapteri 
Rhadinorhynchus decapteri 
Rhadinorhynchus ditrematis 
Rhadinorhynchus dollfusi 
Rhadinorhynchus dorsoventrospinosus 
Rhadinorhynchus dujardini 
Rhadinorhynchus echeneisi 
Rhadinorhynchus erumeii 
Rhadinorhynchus ganapatii 
Rhadinorhynchus gerberi 
Rhadinorhynchus hiansi 
Rhadinorhynchus japonicus 
Rhadinorhynchus johnstoni 
Rhadinorhynchus keralensis 
Rhadinorhynchus laterospinosus 
Rhadinorhynchus lintoni 
Rhadinorhynchus mariserpentis 
Rhadinorhynchus multispinosus 
Rhadinorhynchus oligospinosus 
Rhadinorhynchus ornatus 
Rhadinorhynchus pacificus 
Rhadinorhynchus pelamysi 
Rhadinorhynchus pichelinae 
Rhadinorhynchus plagioscionis 
Rhadinorhynchus plotosi 
Rhadinorhynchus polydactyli 
Rhadinorhynchus polynemi 
Rhadinorhynchus pomatomi 
Rhadinorhynchus pristis 
Rhadinorhynchus saltatrix 
Rhadinorhynchus selkirki 
Rhadinorhynchus seriolae 
Rhadinorhynchus stunkardi 
Rhadinorhynchus trachuri 
Rhadinorhynchus trivandricus 
Rhadinorhynchus vancleavei 
Rhadinorhynchus yangtzenensis 
Rhadinorhynchus zhukovi

References

Acanthocephalans